Metrorail Gauteng is a network of commuter rail services in Gauteng province in South Africa, serving the Johannesburg and Pretoria metro areas. It is operated by Metrorail, a division of the Passenger Rail Agency of South Africa (PRASA).

Metrorail routes spread out across the province from three main hubs: Park Station in Johannesburg, Germiston Station on the East Rand, and Pretoria Station. Routes serve central Johannesburg, the East Rand, Soweto, the Vaal Triangle, the West Rand, central Pretoria, and suburbs to the north, east and west of Pretoria.

Significant areas not served by Metrorail are the northern and western suburbs of Johannesburg, including Sandton and Randburg, and the south-eastern suburbs of Pretoria. Some of the northern suburbs of Johannesburg are now served by the new Gautrain rapid-rail system.

Routes
Metrorail Gauteng consists of the following routes:
 Johannesburg–Dunswart–Daveyton: serves Johannesburg, Germiston, Boksburg and Daveyton
 Johannesburg–Springs: serves Johannesburg, Germiston, Boksburg, Benoni, Brakpan and Springs
 Springs–Nigel: serves Springs and Nigel
 Germiston–Kwesine: serves Germiston and Katlehong
 Germiston–Kliprivier–Vereeniging: serves Germiston, Katlehong, Meyerton and Vereeniging
 Germiston–New Canada: serves Germiston and the Reef south of central Johannesburg
 Johannesburg–New Canada–Vereeniging: serves Johannesburg, Orlando, Lenasia, Sebokeng and Vereeniging
 Johannesburg–Oberholzer: serves Johannesburg, Orlando, Westonaria and Carletonville
 George Goch–Johannesburg–Naledi: serves Johannesburg and Soweto
 Johannesburg–Randfontein: serves Johannesburg, Roodepoort, Krugersdorp and Randfontein
 Johannesburg–Leralla/Pretoria: serves Johannesburg, Germiston, Kempton Park, Tembisa, Centurion and Pretoria
 Pretoria–Saulsville: serves Pretoria, Pretoria West and Atteridgeville
 Pretoria/Belle Ombre–De Wildt/Mabopane: serves Pretoria, Pretoria North, Ga-Rankuwa and Soshanguve
 Pretoria–Pienaarspoort: serves Pretoria, Hatfield and Mamelodi
 Hercules–Capital Park–Pienaarspoort: serves Pretoria North and Mamelodi

See also

 Gautrain

References

External links

 Metrorail official website
 Gauteng Rail Map

Metrorail (South Africa)
Transport in Johannesburg
Transport in Germiston
Transport in Pretoria